Coenochroa chilensis is a species of snout moth in the genus Coenochroa. It was described by Jay C. Shaffer in 1992. It is found in Chile.

References

Moths described in 1992
Phycitinae
Endemic fauna of Chile